was a Japanese bureaucrat and politician who served as Secretary-General of the Liberal Democratic Party from 1961 to 1964, and was the 58th Speaker of the House of Representatives in the National Diet from 1973 to 1976.

In addition, Maeo was a member of prime minister Hayato Ikeda's "brain trust" in 1960 that helped formulate the Income Doubling Plan. After Ikeda died in 1965, Maeo served as the second head of the Kōchikai political faction within the Liberal Democratic Party, a post he held until 1971.

Life and career

Shigesaburō Maeo was born into poverty in the seaside town of Miyazu in Kyoto prefecture in 1905. His father ran a pottery business, and his mother had no formal education. An avid reader, Maeo did well in school. Maeo's family could not afford to send him to middle school, but luckily a local doctor stepped in and paid his tution. In his final year of middle school, Maeo passed the extremely difficult examination to enter the First High School in Tokyo. First High School was the most prestigious high school in Japan, and gaining entry virtually guaranteed acceptance to Tokyo Imperial University. After graduating from Tokyo Imperial University in 1929, Maeo entered the Ministry of Finance, where he became close friends with fellow bureaucrat Hayato Ikeda.

In 1949, Maeo was inspired by his friend Ikeda's example, running for and winning a seat in the lower house of the National Diet to represent Kyoto's 2nd district. Maeo first entered the Diet as a member of Shigeru Yoshida's Democratic Liberal Party, which later merged to become part of the Liberal Democratic Party (LDP).

A member of Ikeda's "brain trust" (burēn), Maeo was a founding member of Ikeda's Kōchikai faction in 1957. When Ikeda was brought into the cabinet of prime minister Nobusuke Kishi as Minister of Finance, Maeo was brought on as well, becoming Minister of International Trade and Industry. Later, as chairman of the LDP's Bureau of Economic Policy Research, Maeo played a key role in designing Ikeda's "Income Doubling Plan," announced in 1960, which promised to double Japan's GDP within 10 years' time. During Ikeda's time in office as prime minister from 1960 to 1964, Maeo served three terms as General Secretary of the LDP, working hard to support Ikeda's policies in general and the Income Doubling Plan in particular.

When Ikeda died of cancer on August 13, 1965, Maeo stepped in to become the second head of the Kōchikai faction. However, Maeo was not as adept at accumulating political donations as Ikeda had been, and lacked Ikeda's interpersonal skills. As Eisaku Satō won four consecutive terms as prime minister, younger members of the faction became increasingly dissatisfied with Maeo's leadership and finally voted him out in favor of the slightly younger Masayoshi Ōhira 

Shortly after being ousted as Kōchikai faction head, Maeo was appointed Minister of Justice by Satō. He then served a stint as the 58th Speaker of the House of Representatives under the administrations of Kakuei Tanaka and Takeo Miki from 1973 to 1976.

In 1979, Maeo lost reelection to his seat in the Diet to a Japan Socialist Party candidate by a mere 174 votes, but regained his seat in the 1980 election.  He died of a heart attack in 1981, at the age of 75.

Legacy
Unlike most LDP politicians, Maeo was at heart more of an intellectual than a political power broker. He amassed a personal library of 39,000 volumes and his stated hobby was the study of etymology. He was an extremely taciturn man, such that his colleagues nicknamed him the "Bull in the Darkness" (暗闇の牛, kurayami no ushi) because they had a hard time figuring out what he was thinking. But they later found out that he always listened carefully to what other people said and then took decisive action.

Maeo preferred to work on policy behind the scenes rather than engage in public campaigning and politicking. He displayed no avarice for positions of power, repeatedly turning down cabinet posts he was owed due to his seniority to allow younger men to advance their careers. He also acquired a reputation for unselfishness and impartiality in resolving thorny political problems in a way that was fair to all. Maeo's sense of fair play, lack of personal ambition, and disinterestedness in sharp-elbowed political infighting made him a poor factional leader, leading to his ouster as Kōchikai faction head, but earned him the respect and admiration of both friends and enemies alike. In the 1970s, Maeo became known as one of the "Three Wise Men" (三賢人, san kenjin) of the LDP, alongside Etsusaburo Shiina and Hirokichi Nadao, who exercised a strong influence over LDP politics from behind the scenes.

References

Citations

Sources cited

1905 births
1981 deaths
People from Kyoto Prefecture
University of Tokyo alumni
Members of the House of Representatives (Japan)
Liberal Democratic Party (Japan) politicians
20th-century Japanese politicians
Politicians from Kyoto Prefecture